The 2016–17 Duquesne Dukes men's basketball team represented Duquesne University during the 2016–17 NCAA Division I men's basketball season. The Dukes, led by fifth-year head coach Jim Ferry, played their home games at the A. J. Palumbo Center in Pittsburgh, Pennsylvania as members of the Atlantic 10 Conference. They finished the season 10–22, 3–15 in A-10 play to finish in last place. In the A-10 tournament, they lost in the first round to Saint Louis.

On March 13, 2017, Duquesne fired head coach Jim Ferry after five seasons. The school then hired Akron head coach Keith Dambrot on March 28.

Previous season
The Dukes finished the 2015–16 season with a record of 17–17, 6–12 in A-10 play to finish in a tie for tenth place. They lost to La Salle in the first round of the A-10 tournament. The Dukes were invited to the College Basketball Invitational where they defeated Nebraska–Omaha in the first round before losing in the quarterfinals to Morehead State.

Offseason

Departures

Incoming transfers

2016 recruiting class

Preseason 
Duquesne was picked to finish in 13th place in the A-10 preseason poll.

Roster

Schedule and results

|-
!colspan=9 style=| Exhibition

|-
!colspan=9 style=| Non-conference regular season

|-
!colspan=9 style=|Atlantic 10 regular season

|-
!colspan=9 style=|Atlantic 10 tournament

Source

See also
 2016–17 Duquesne Dukes women's basketball team

References

Duquesne
Duquesne Dukes men's basketball seasons
Duquesne
Duquesne